Branger is a surname. Notable people with the surname include:

Ana Branger (born 1920s), Venezuelan aviator
Johan Branger (born 1993), British footballer

See also
Branker